Several ships have been named Cicero after the Roman statesman, orator, lawyer, and philosopher Cicero:

 was launched at Sunderland and initially sailed as a West Indiaman. She was briefly captured in 1799. She went whale hunting both in the northern whale fishery (1803-1808), and the southern whale fishery (1816-1823). She capsized at Limerick in September 1832 and was condemned there.
, of 227 tons (bm), was built in the Smith Yard in Boston.
 was launched at Hull as a whaler. She made six full voyages to the northern whale fishery and was lost in July 1826 on her seventh.
, of 226 or 252 tons (bm),was launched at Mattapoisett, Massachusetts. Between 1831 and 1882 she made 18 voyages as a whaler. She was abandoned and broken up in 1883.
 was an iron ship of 1130 tons (NRT) and 1057 tons under deck, launched at Liverpool by Thomas Vernon & Son, Liverpool. Cicero transferred her registry to Germany. On 11 November 1890 she left Shields with a cargo of coal for Valparaiso and was not heard from thereafter.

See also

Citations

Cicero